Arthur Barrett Donnelly (May 31, 1875 – July 29, 1919) was a United States Army officer in the late 19th and early 20th centuries.

Biography

Donnelly was born in St. Louis on May 31, 1875. On December 7, 1892, he enlisted in the 1st Missouri Infantry Regiment. By the Spanish–American War, Donnelly commanded his company, and by the time he participated in the Pancho Villa Expedition in 1916, he commanded his regiment. On January 8, 1917, he was promoted to Adjutant General of the Missouri National Guard, holding the rank of brigadier general. On March 25, 1917, Missouri's governor gave Donnelly an indefinite leave of absence in order to assume command of the 1st Missouri Infantry. After his appointment as a brigadier general on August 5, 1917, he commanded the 69th Infantry Brigade at what is now Fort Sill.

In addition to his service in the military, Donnelly worked at the Hamilton-Brown Shoe Company from 1901 to 1906 as a factory department manager, and from 1906 to 1908 as an assistant factory superintendent and buyer. He later served as president of the leather goods producer Arthur B. Donnelly and Company, as well as the Interstate Mercantile Company and Missouri Paint Varnish Company.

In April 1918, Donnelly was accused of Conduct unbecoming an officer for drinking, gambling, and allowing officers under his command to do so.  Rather than face court-martial, he resigned his brigadier general's appointment and applied for a commission at a lower rank.  Donnelly was commissioned as a major and assigned to duty with the 11th Infantry Division's 71st Infantry Regiment at Fort George G. Meade, Maryland.

While conducting a post-war East Coast sightseeing tour, Donnelly was killed in an automobile accident near Blue Ridge Summit, Pennsylvania on July 29, 1919.  The crash injured his wife, daughter, two sons and other passengers.  Donnelly was interred at Calvary Cemetery and Mausoleum in St. Louis.

Personal life
Donnelly married Anna Pike Renick on May 10, 1898. He was a member of the Catholic Church as well as a Republican.

References

External links

Bibliography

1875 births
1919 deaths
Military personnel from St. Louis
Adjutants general of the National Guard of the United States
United States Army generals of World War I
United States Army generals
Road incident deaths in Pennsylvania